The 2016 Horizon League women's soccer tournament is the postseason women's soccer tournament for the Horizon League. It was held from October 31 to November 5, 2016. The five match tournament will be held at campus sites, with the semifinals and final held at Engelmann Stadium in Milwaukee, Wisconsin. The six team single-elimination tournament will consist of three rounds based on seeding from regular season conference play. The Oakland Golden Grizzlies are the defending tournament champions after defeating the Wright State Raiders in the championship match.

Bracket

Schedule

First round

Semifinals

Final

References 

2016 Horizon League women's soccer season
Horizon League Women's Soccer Tournament